The 2014–15 DePaul Blue Demons women's basketball team will represent DePaul University during the 2014–15 NCAA Division I women's basketball season. The Blue Demons, led by twenty ninth year head coach Doug Bruno, play their home games at the McGrath-Phillips Arena and Allstate Arena. They were members of the new Big East Conference. They finish the season 27–8, 15–3 in Big East play to share the regular season title with Seton Hall. They also won the Big East tournament to earn an automatic trip to the NCAA women's basketball tournament where defeated Minnesota in the first round before losing to Notre Dame in the second round.

2014–15 Roster

Schedule

|-
!colspan=9 style="background:#E60D2E; color:#006EC7;"| Exhibition

|-
!colspan=9 style="background:#006EC7; color:#E60D2E;"| Regular season

|-
!colspan=9 style="background:#E60D2E;"| Big East tournament

|-
!colspan=9 style="background:#E60D2E;"| NCAA Women's Tournament

Rankings

References

DePaul Blue Demons women's basketball seasons
DePaul
DePaul
Depaul
Depaul